Ben Lowe (born 13 March 1985) is an Australian former professional rugby league footballer who played his whole career with the South Sydney Rabbitohs in the NRL. He primarily played lock and second-row, but could also fill in as a centre.

Early life
Born in Toowoomba, Queensland Ben is the brother of Jaiman. He was educated at St Mary's College, Toowoomba

Playing career
In 2008, Lowe made his first grade debut in Round two for the South Sydney Rabbitohs against the Canterbury-Bankstown Bulldogs, a game in which he scored the first try of the match and also of his NRL career. In round 25 of 2009 he scored a try in South Sydney's 41–6 flogging of the St. George Illawarra Dragons.

Lowe is the younger brother of fellow Rabbitoh Jaiman Lowe. He was selected to be the 18th man in the Queensland squad for the third State Of Origin game in 2010. He was a part of the South Sydney squad that won the 2014 NRL Premiership, being named on an extended bench for the final., Although Lowe did not understand why he was not selected for the top 17 because he is the 3rd longest serving member of the team, he is just below John Sutton and Issac Luke (who was suspended for the grand final).

On 5 August 2015, Lowe announced his retirement from rugby league.  Injuries had forced Lowe to retire, with consideration to life after football for him and his family.  Lowe 116 first grade games - all for South Sydney between the years of 2008 and 2015.  Stated “Due to injuries I’ve had to make the difficult decision to retire from football immediately. It hasn't been the easiest decision to make but after long conversations with family and loved ones it was the best for my welfare and the best for my family as we head into life after football,”.  Lowe also provided great service to South's feeder club side the North Sydney Bears whom he played 45 games for scoring 8 tries.

He played his last NRL game on 25 July 2015 where South Sydney beat Newcastle by 46 points in a 52-6 score.  Lowe played for only 9 minutes off the bench in jersey number 14.

Statistics

NRL
 Statistics are correct as of Lowe's retirement at the end of the 2015 season 

Note: In 2014 Ben Lowe was asked to kick a goal for his 100th NRL game in round 23 against the Broncos
Note 2: In 2015 Ben Lowe retired immediately at the end of round 21 due to ongoing injuries

References

External links
South Sydney Rabbitohs profile

1985 births
Living people
Australian rugby league players
North Sydney Bears players
Rugby league locks
Rugby league players from Toowoomba
Rugby league second-rows
South Sydney Rabbitohs players